The hazel dormouse or common dormouse (Muscardinus avellanarius) is a small dormouse species native to Europe and the only living species in the genus Muscardinus.

Distribution and habitat
The hazel dormouse is native to northern Europe and Asia Minor. It is the only dormouse native to the British Isles, and is therefore often referred to simply as the "dormouse" in British sources, although the edible dormouse, Glis glis, has been accidentally introduced and now has an established population in South East England. Though Ireland has no native dormouse, the hazel dormouse was discovered in County Kildare in 2010, and appears to be spreading rapidly, helped by the prevalence of hedgerows in the Irish countryside.

The United Kingdom distribution of the hazel dormouse can be found on the  National Biodiversity Network website. A 2020 study found that hazel dormice in Britain have declined by 51% since 2000. Woodland habitat loss and management and a warming climate are seen as material threats to their future status.

Habitat
According to English Nature's Dormouse Conservation Handbook, hazel dormice are "particularly associated with deciduous woodland" but also inhabit hedgerows and scrub.

Dormice seldom travel more than 70 m from their nest.

Description 

It weighs , although this increases to  just before hibernation. This small mammal has reddish brown fur that can vary up to golden-brown or yellow-orange-brown becoming lighter in the lower part. Eyes are large and black. Ears are small and not very developed, while the tail is long and completely covered with hair.

It is a nocturnal creature and spends most of its waking hours among the branches of trees looking for food. It will make long detours rather than come down to the ground and expose itself to danger. The hazel dormouse hibernates from October to April–May.

Behaviour

Starting from the onset of colder weather (October/November), the hazel dormouse will hibernate in nests on the ground, in the base of old coppiced trees or hazel stools, under piles of leaves or under log piles as these situations are not subject to extreme variations in either temperature or humidity. Dormice are almost completely arboreal in habit but much less reluctant to cross open ground than was thought even recently. When it wakes up in spring (late April or early May), it builds woven nests of shredded honeysuckle bark, fresh leaves and grasses in the undergrowth. If the weather is cold and wet, and food scarce, it saves energy by going into torpor; it curls up into a ball and goes to sleep. The hazel dormouse, therefore, spends a large proportion of its life sleeping − either hibernating in winter or in torpor in summer.

Examination of hazelnuts may show a neat, round hole in the shell. This indicates it has been opened by a small rodent, e.g., the dormouse, wood mouse, or bank vole. Other animals, such as squirrels or jays, will either split the shell completely in half or make a jagged hole in it.

Further examination reveals the cut surface of the hole has toothmarks which follow the direction of the shell. In addition, there will be toothmarks on the outer surface of the nut, at an angle of about 45 degrees to the cut surface. Woodmice and voles bite across the nutshell leaving clear parallel toothmarks from inside to outside. Woodmice also leave toothmarks on the outer surface of the nut but voles do not.

Diet
The hazel dormouse requires a variety of arboreal foods to survive. It eats berries and nuts and other fruit with hazelnuts being the main food for fattening up before hibernation. 
The dormouse also eats hornbeam and blackthorn fruit where hazel is scarce. Other food sources are the buds of young leaves, and flowers which provide nectar and pollen. The dormouse also eats insects found on food-source trees, particularly aphids and caterpillars.

Plants of value to dormice

Hazel is the principal food source, supports insects, forms an understory of poles, especially when coppiced, which makes it useful for its arboreal activity. The hazel dormouse's Latin name avellanarius means "hazel".
Oaks supply insect and flower food; the acorns are of little value.
Honeysuckle bark is their primary nesting material, and flowers and fruit are used for food.
Bramble flowers and fruits provide food over a long period. The thorns give protection for nests. Dormice thrive on blackberries.
Alder buckthorn – in parts of the dormouse range where hazel is scarce or absent, berries of alder buckthorn is the principal food source and vital for the accumulation of fat reserves in autumn prior to hibernation.
Willow – unripe seeds in early spring.
Birch – seeds.
Hawthorn flowers are an important food in the spring. The fruit is eaten occasionally.
Blackthorn – fruits (blackthorn fruit is called "sloe").
Ash – seed keys whilst they are still on the tree.
Sycamore supplies insects and pollen, and a habitat. However, they cast a dense shade which decreases the understory.
Hornbeam – seeds.
Wayfaring tree (Viburnum lantana) – fruits and flowers.
Broom – flowers (in early summer).
Yew – fruits are a favoured food.
Sweet chestnut provides an excellent foodsource, and the flowers are eaten, as well.

Threats 
 Predation from foxes, wild boars, weasels, owls and domestic cats.
 Being dug up or disturbed during hibernation by badgers.
 Lack of food source, e.g., from too frequent hedge-trimming, or competition from other species, e.g., squirrels, other dormouse species, mice.
 Destruction of forest and hedgerow habitats, or their diverse range of species, as a broad spectrum of food is required across the calendar year.
 Reduction in traditional forest management.
 A warming climate.

Protection status
The hazel dormouse is protected by and in UK under the Wildlife and Countryside Act.

Evolutionary history 
The oldest fossils of the genus Muscardinus date to the Serravallian stage of the Middle Miocene approximately 13.8 to 11.6 million years ago in what is now Spain. The oldest fossils of the modern species date to the Early Pleistocene.

References

External links 

The Mammal Society site with a Hazel dormouse fact sheet. There is also a book entitled The Dormouse available, by Pat Morris.
Peoples Trust for Endangered Species site describing the hazel dormouse and its conservation
Information and images from the BBC
Extensive information and pictures
Pet care
A lot of facts, links and book reviews about the dormouse
Dormouse nest-box construction

Dormice
Mammals of Asia
Rodents of Europe
Mammals of Russia
Mammals of Turkey
Mammals described in 1758
Taxa named by Carl Linnaeus